Jorge Cohen (born 1986), is an Angolan film producer. He is best known as the producer of critically acclaimed films Alambamento, Luanda 24/7 and Air Conditioning.

Personal life
He was born on 1986 in Luanda, Angola. In 2009, he moved to Portugal and completed master's degree in Business Administration from the Catholic University of Lisbon. Then he moved to England and obtained his next master's degree in Global Cultural and Creative Industries from SOAS, University of London in 2018.

Career
In 2009, Cohen made his first production Alambamento, a short film. He was the production director of that short, which received critical acclaim. After the success of the short, he became the co-founder of production company 'Geração 80' in 2010. Later he made several short films including: Luanda 24/7, Havemos de Voltar and 1999 as well as documentaries; Triângulo, Independência directed by Mário Bastos. The documentary Independência won the award for the Best Documentary at the Cameron International Film Festival and was an Official Selection at the Durban International Film Festival, Luxor African Film Festival and the Pan African Film Festival.

His 2013 film Triângulo was an Angola-Brazil-Portugal co-production. In 2014, he produced television documentary Afripedia Angola as a Sweden-Angola co-production. IN 2017, he produced the documentary El Último País which was directed by Cuban director Gretel Marín. The film made Official Selection of the Amsterdam Festival 2017 as well. In 2020, he made his first fictional feature film, Air Conditioning.

Filmography

References

External links
 

Living people
1986 births
Angolan film people
Cuban film producers
Brazilian film producers
People from Luanda